Sergio de la Peña is an American politician and retired United States Army colonel who was deputy Assistant Secretary of Defense for Western Hemisphere Affairs during the Trump administration.

Career

De la Peña retired from the Army as a colonel. During his career, he was also a division chief of the U.S. Northern Command. De la Peña worked for the private military contractor L-3 before founding de la Peña Consulting, LLC in June 2011. He spent five years leading the consultancy.

De la Peña was surrogate for the Donald Trump 2016 presidential campaign, and was then part of the Trump transition team assigned to the United States Department of Defense. In 2017, Defense Secretary James Mattis appointed De la Peña as deputy Assistant Secretary of Defense for the Western Hemisphere.

2021 Virginia gubernatorial election 

On January 11, 2021, de la Peña announced his candidacy as a Republican candidate for the 2021 Virginia gubernatorial election.

References

Living people
People from Chihuahua City
People from Roswell, New Mexico
University of Iowa alumni
United States Army Command and General Staff College alumni
Virginia Republicans
Candidates in the 2021 United States elections
Mexican emigrants to the United States
Year of birth missing (living people)